James Crisp (born 11 October 1982 in Nottingham) is a British swimmer. He has won gold medals in the Paralympic Games as well as the IPC world and European championships, breaking numerous records in the process. He competes in S9 classification events after having contracted polio as a child.

Personal life
Crisp was born on 11 October 1982 in Nottingham. He contracted polio as a child through vaccination and was encouraged to take up swimming as a form of physiotherapy. He moved to Sheffield to study at university and became a member of the City of Sheffield Swim Squad (COSSS), training at Ponds Forge.

Swimming career
Crisp competes in S9 swimming events and has won medals in all the different competitive swimming strokes. He holds a number of British and European records across a range of different strokes and lengths. He has won world championship titles in the freestyle, breaststroke, backstroke, and the individual medley as well as being part of the 2002 championship-winning 4x100 m relay team.

Paralympic Games
To date Crisp has won twelve Paralympic medals. Seven of the medals were awarded at the 2000 Summer Paralympics including individual golds in the 100 m backstroke and the 200 m individual medley. He was also part of the victorious 4x100 m freestyle relay team alongside Jody Cundy, Giles Long, David Roberts, Matt Walker and Marc Woods. At the 2004 Games Crisp won four individual medals, including three silvers, with all four events being in different stroke styles.

In what he has described as the most difficult time of his 14-year career Crisp missed out on the 2008 Games due to a shoulder injury.

IPC World and European championships
Crisp has achieved significant success in the IPC Swimming World Championships, winning sixteen medals. He claimed two golds in 1998, five in 2002, and one in 2006. He has also seen many victories in the European Championships, winning three golds in 1999, four in 2001, and one in 2011. He has been on the podium thirteen times at the European events.

References

1982 births
Living people
People with polio
Sportspeople from Nottingham
British male medley swimmers
Paralympic swimmers of Great Britain
Paralympic gold medalists for Great Britain
Paralympic silver medalists for Great Britain
Paralympic bronze medalists for Great Britain
Swimmers at the 2000 Summer Paralympics
Swimmers at the 2004 Summer Paralympics
Swimmers at the 2012 Summer Paralympics
Medalists at the 2000 Summer Paralympics
Medalists at the 2004 Summer Paralympics
Medalists at the 2012 Summer Paralympics
S9-classified Paralympic swimmers
Medalists at the World Para Swimming Championships
Medalists at the World Para Swimming European Championships
Paralympic medalists in swimming
British male freestyle swimmers
British male backstroke swimmers
21st-century British people